Scott Dulchavsky is the Roy D. McClure Chairman of Surgery and Surgeon-in-Chief at the Henry Ford Hospital and Professor of Surgery, Molecular Biology and Genetics at the Wayne State University School of Medicine.

External links
Biography from the Henry Ford Innovation Institute

Year of birth missing (living people)
Living people
American surgeons
Wayne State University alumni
Wayne State University faculty